Katarina Pavlović (born 30 January 1995) is a Croatian handballer for CSM Târgu Jiu and the Croatian national team.

She represented Croatia at the 2022 European Women's Handball Championship.

References

External links

1995 births
Living people
Croatian female handball players
People from Ljubuški
Croats of Bosnia and Herzegovina
Competitors at the 2022 Mediterranean Games
Mediterranean Games silver medalists for Croatia
Mediterranean Games medalists in handball